Nicholas I may refer to:

 Pope Nicholas I ( 800–867), or Nicholas the Great
 Nicholas Mystikos (852–925), Patriarch Nicholas I of Constantinople
 Nicholas I (bishop of the Isles) (fl. 1147–1152), Bishop-elect of the Isles
 Nicholas I, Lord of Mecklenburg (died 1200)
 Nicholas I of Transylvania (died after 1203), voivode of Transylvania
 Nicholas I (bishop of Schleswig) (died 1233)
 Patriarch Nicholas I of Alexandria, Greek Patriarch of Alexandria between 1210 and 1243
 Nicholas I, Duke of Troppau (c. 1255–1318), natural son of king Ottokar II of Bohemia, became Duke of Troppau in Silesia
 Nicholas I, Lord of Rostock (died 1314)
 Nicholas I, Count of Tecklenburg (died 1367)
 Nicholas I Garai (died 1386), chief governor of Bratislava, palatine to the King of Hungary
 Nicholas I of Opole ( 1424–1476)
 Nicholas I, Duke of Lorraine (1448–1473)
 Nicolaus I Bernoulli (1687–1759); Swiss mathematician
 Nicholas I, Prince Esterházy (1714–1790), Hungarian prince
 Nicholas I of Russia (1796–1855), Emperor of Russia and King of Poland
 Nikola I Petrović-Njegoš (1841–1921), King of Montenegro

See also

 
 Niccolò I (disambiguation)
 Nicholas (disambiguation)
 Nikola I (disambiguation)